Nitipong Selanon (born May 25, 1993), simply known as Non, is a Thai professional footballer who plays as a right back for Thai League 1 club Bangkok United and the Thailand national team.

International career

Nitipong won the AFF U-19 Youth Championship with Thailand U19, and played in 2012 AFC U-19 Championship. 

In March, 2018 he was in the squad of Thailand for 2018 King's Cup, but did not make an appearance.

Honours

Club
Buriram United
 Thai Premier League (1): 2014

Port
 Thai FA Cup (1): 2019

International
Thailand U-19
 AFF U-19 Youth Championship (1): 2011

External links
 
Nitipong Selanon profile at Port website

1993 births
Living people
Nitipong Selanon
Nitipong Selanon
Association football fullbacks
Nitipong Selanon
Nitipong Selanon
Nitipong Selanon
Nitipong Selanon
Nitipong Selanon
Nitipong Selanon
Nitipong Selanon
Nitipong Selanon
Nitipong Selanon